Toshihiro Kennoki (3 September 1901 - 29 November 1992) was a Japanese politician. Kennoki served as Minister of Education under Prime Minister Eisaku Satō from 1966 to 1967. He is credited for having been one of the central figures who helped drive the Central Council for Education.

Career
Kennoki joined the House of Councilors in 1953 with the goal of promoting education reform within the LDP. He was among a wave of more progressively-minded members of the National Diet, along with later Minister of Education Michita Sakata, that wanted to prioritize "policy over politics" when it came to education.

Kennoki originally rose to prominence as a bureaucrat within the Ministry of Education, Science, Sports and Culture. He was interested in the field of primary education and education reform in general, and held the positions of Director of the Higher Education and Science Bureau within the Ministry and Vice Minister of Education.

Right around the beginning of 1967, 20 years after the post-war Japanese education system was introduced, Kennoki was chosen as Minister of Education to try and reevaluate the educational system. Kennoki had, beforehand, criticized the American system being imposed on Japan, describing it as a "trick" (karakuri) and blaming the education system on a conspiracy. He believed that:

In July 1967, Kennoki requested for the Central Council for Education to look into the entire education system and provide new guidelines for it. This request kicked off an investigation into the education system that would result in the Council's publishing of radical new guidelines in 1971, something that would define Japanese educational policy decades on. Kennoki recalled that the request was made by his own volition, and that he remembers that he only had one other LDP member look over it.

In October 1967, Kennoki declared a militant strike by Nikkyoso (the Japanese teachers' union) over low wages imposed by the Satō government to be illegal, stating that he would only meet with the striking teachers if they renounced their Code of Ethics and did not use force to try and influence government policy.

References

Citations

Bibliography
Books
 
 
 
 

Articles
 

Education ministers of Japan
1901 births
1992 deaths
Liberal Democratic Party (Japan) politicians
People from Fukuoka Prefecture
University of Tokyo alumni